Cuppa may refer to:

 British slang for a cup of tea
 Cuppa Coffee Studios, an animation studio in Toronto 
 Cuppa (Java library) (in computer programming), a unit testing framework 
 Bay of Cuppa in the Shetland Islands, Scotland